William K. Willis / Scioto River High School was a high school in Delaware, Ohio. It's a part of the Scioto Juvenile Correctional Facility.  All youth prisoners who do not have a high school degree are required to participate in the educational program.

William K. Willis High School is for female youth prisoners, while Scioto River High School is for the male youth prisoners.

References

External links
 Correctional Facility Website

High schools in Delaware County, Ohio
Public high schools in Ohio